The Northerners is a 1992 Dutch film by Alex van Warmerdam. The film was selected as the Dutch entry for the Best Foreign Language Film at the 65th Academy Awards, but was not accepted as a nominee. This black comedy takes places in the 1960s, in a surreal Dutch new town consisting of only a single street. It is a darkly amusing satire of bourgeois life and its repressions, pursuit of fantasies through a Freudian forest are all executed with visual and dramatic flair. Van Warmerdam himself has said that he considers this his best film.

It won him a (Gouden Kalf) for best director, and the movie was nominated for the International Fantasy Film Award. Actor Rudolf Lucieer won a Gouden Kalf for his role as Anton, the forester. The movie is part of the official Canon of Dutch films  and has gained cult film status.

Plot
A surreal black comedy set in a decrepit 1960s housing development. When Thomas' mother Martha is drawn into sainthood and changed their home into a shrine this frustrated his father the local butcher, Jacob and he finds it difficult to manage it all with his sexual needs. Thomas, 12-year-old son, becomes obsessed with events on the broadcast news – the liberation of the Belgian Congo is taking place and Thomas calls himself Lumumba, after the Congolese leader Patrice Lumumba. Thomas spends hours alone in the forest. It is there that he meets Agnes, a half-naked woman who lives in the forest and hides at the bottom of a pond and shows him how to breathe under water by sucking on a stem. He is encouraged in this escapism by Simon, the postman who reads all the mail and knows all of the bizarre and intimate secrets of the eccentric inhabitants of the town. Meanwhile, Anton a gun-crazed forester moves around the forest in search of trespassers. He is incapable of meeting his wife, Elisabeth's needs. Adding further complications are two Belgian priests who visit the town, bringing with them an exhibition of Africana and a Negro. Jacob turns into a cad and attacks women. Thomas has sexual confrontations with Agnes, but often disturbed by his mother's "divine" premonitions. Anton who is engaged in activities outside his family life, captures Simon red-handed in his act (looking at the school teacher's subscribed adult magazine) and tries to capture the Negro. Anton accidentally kills Agnes and hides the body under the pond. The Negro sees this and blinds Anton. Later Anton seeks the Negro to kill and finds him, but leaves him alone. Elizabeth knowing she is pregnant with Jacob's child leaves Anton, since he has turned asexual. Meanwhile, Martha's fasting has rendered her bedridden and the villagers pray at her window believing her to be a saint rather than a depressed woman. The church officiates Martha as a saint. Things go beyond Jacob can handle. Later blind Anton is found dead from the cold under a tree by the Negro. The Negro leaves the Town. Later through the news its heard Lumumba is murdered, which saddens Thomas. Simon comes back to the settlement housing unit as the official post-master, Thomas welcomes him wholeheartedly.

Cast
 Jack Wouterse - Jacob
 Annet Malherbe - Martha
 Rudolf Lucieer - Anton
 Loes Wouterson - Elisabeth
 Leonard Lucieer - Thomas
 Alex van Warmerdam - Simon 
 Veerle Dobbelaere - Agnes
 Dary Some - Negro
 Jacques Commandeur - Teacher
 Theo van Gogh - Fat Willy
 Loes Luca - Fat Willy's Mother
 Annemarie Blom - Neighbour
 Cecile Heuer - Neighbour
 Leny Breederveld - Neighbour
 Olga Zuiderhoek - Neighbour

See also
 List of submissions to the 65th Academy Awards for Best Foreign Language Film
 List of Dutch submissions for the Academy Award for Best Foreign Language Film

References

External links 
 
 

1992 films
1990s black comedy films
1990s Dutch-language films
Dutch black comedy films
European Film Awards winners (films)
Films set in 1960
Films directed by Alex van Warmerdam
1992 comedy films